Madhuban Assembly constituency may refer to
 Madhuban, Bihar Assembly constituency
 Madhuban, Uttar Pradesh Assembly constituency